Algirdas Tatulis is a paralympic athlete from Lithuania competing mainly in category F42 shot put and discus events.

Algirdas competed in both the shot put and discus in the 1996 and 2000 Summer Paralympics but it wasn't till concentrating on the discus in 2004 that he won a medal, a bronze.  This feat he was unable to match when again competing solely in the discus at the 2008 Summer Paralympics.

References

Paralympic athletes of Lithuania
Athletes (track and field) at the 1996 Summer Paralympics
Athletes (track and field) at the 2000 Summer Paralympics
Athletes (track and field) at the 2004 Summer Paralympics
Athletes (track and field) at the 2008 Summer Paralympics
Paralympic bronze medalists for Lithuania
Living people
Medalists at the 2004 Summer Paralympics
Year of birth missing (living people)
Paralympic medalists in athletics (track and field)
Lithuanian male discus throwers
Lithuanian male shot putters
Discus throwers with limb difference
Shot putters with limb difference
Paralympic discus throwers
Paralympic shot putters